William Smelt may refer to:
 William Smelt (politician) (1690–1755), English politician, MP for Northallerton
 William Smelt (British Army officer) (1788–1858)